Telephone numbers in Nigeria use a combination of area codes and personal numbers. Area codes are one digit (Lagos, Ibadan and Abuja) or two digits. Local phone numbers contain between five and seven digits. The length of a phone number can vary within an area code. Mobile phone numbers start with 070, 080 or 081, 090 or 091 and are followed by eight digits.

Calling formats 
These examples use calls to Lagos as example:
 xxx xxxx – Calls within an area code
 01 xxx xxxx – Calls from outside Lagos
 +234 1 xxx xxxx – Calls from outside Nigeria
 0xxx xxx xxxx  – Calls to a mobile number (see below)
 042 xxx xxxx – Land line calls to Enugu
 052****** – Land line calls to Edo

Mobile phone network prefixes 
The following prefixes are assigned to mobile phone network operators. Nigeria implemented mobile number portability in 2013. Therefore, prefixes no longer reliably indicate which network a phone number is on.

Area codes

See also
List of telephone operating companies in Nigeria

References

External links
ITU allocations list

 
Telecommunications in Nigeria
Telephone numbers
Nigeria